"Higher Place" is a song by Belgian DJ duo Dimitri Vegas & Like Mike. It features the vocals from American singer Ne-Yo, who co-wrote the lyrics with Dimitri Thivaios. The single gave the duo their first number one in the United States, where it topped the Billboard Dance Club Songs chart in its 6 January 2016 issue.

Track listing

Chart performance

Weekly charts

Year-end charts

Certifications

See also
 List of number-one dance singles of 2016 (U.S.)

References

External links 
 

2015 songs
2015 singles
Ne-Yo songs
Dimitri Vegas & Like Mike songs
Capitol Records singles
Motown singles
Number-one singles in Belgium
Songs written by Ne-Yo